Richard Dennis Harris (21 October 1911 – 30 September 1993) was an Australian rules footballer who played in the Victorian Football League (VFL) between 1934 and 1944 for the Richmond Football Club. Harris played mainly as a rover and was highly successful in front of goals. He also represented Victoria at interstate football, playing a total of nine games for his state including the 1937 Perth Carnival.

Early life
Born and raised in Warrnambool, he started his playing career with Victoria Ward in the Warrnambool Junior FA in 1927. His father had told him he would get a shilling for every goal he kicked. His first game he kicked seven goals. In 1931 he joined the main town side Warrnambool in the Western District Football League. He kicked 96 goals in his first season and was the league's leading goalkicker. In 1933 Warrnambool moved to the Hampden Football League and Harris was again the league's leading goalkicker with 85 goals.

VFL career
At the end of 1933  recruited him and he made his debut for them in 1934. Harris played mainly as a rover and was highly successful in front of goals, kicking 51 goals in his debut season. He topped Richmond's goalkicking on three occasions and his career best 64 goals in the 1937 home and away season was the most in the VFL that year. A premiership player in 1934, Harris was a member of another Richmond premiership team in 1943 when he kicked seven goals in their five-point Grand Final win against Essendon Football Club.

VFA career
At the end of the 1944 season he left the league and joined Victorian Football Association (VFA) club Williamstown, helping them to the 1945 premiership. Later, after two seasons at Williamstown, Harris was cleared to Yarraville as captain coach in May 1947.

Later years

He moved onto the Federal league club Mordialloc, and captain-coached them to a hat-trick of premierships from 1950 to 1952. Harris later was appointed as Reserves coach for Camberwell in the VFA in 1953.

Harris returned to Richmond as the Reserve grade coach in 1956. He held the position until the end of 1965. In 1964 he acted as the senior coach of Richmond when their current coach, Len Smith, had a heart attack, Harris stepped up and coached to the end of the season.

References

Sources

 Atkinson, G. (1982) Everything you ever wanted to know about Australian rules football but couldn't be bothered asking, The Five Mile Press: Melbourne. .
 Hogan P: The Tigers of Old, Richmond FC, Melbourne 1996
Richmond Football Club – Hall of Fame
Dick Harris' playing record from The VFA Project

Richmond Football Club coaches
Richmond Football Club players
Richmond Football Club Premiership players
Williamstown Football Club players
Mordialloc Football Club players
Yarraville Football Club players
Warrnambool Football Club players
VFL Leading Goalkicker Medal winners
Australian rules footballers from Victoria (Australia)
1993 deaths
1911 births
Two-time VFL/AFL Premiership players